Kilnaleck or Kilnalec is a small village in County Cavan, Ireland on the R154 regional road. Kilnaleck was once the centre of a mining boom when in 1879 some local businessmen and a school headmaster decided to develop the coal that existed nearby. However, the coal was very deep and hard to extract and the mine was forced to close. The village is part of Crosserlough parish.

Transport
A number of Cavan Area Rural Transport (CART) routes serve Kilnaleck.  Over the decades Kilnaleck was served by CIÉ and from 1987 by Bus Éireann. However in 2009 the remaining service, Bus Éireann route 179, was discontinued. Nowadays the nearest Bus Éireann routes may be accessed at Mountnugent (route 187) or Ballinagh (route 111), 7 km and 10 km distant respectively.

Amenities
There is a national school in the village. There is also a children's playground, Roman Catholic church, Garda station.

Sport
Kilnaleck is home to Crosserlough GFC, and Innyvale Athletic Club is based out of the GAA grounds in Kilnaleck.

There are equestrian facilities in the village.

See also
 List of towns and villages in the Republic of Ireland

References

Towns and villages in County Cavan